Parkins is a surname, and may refer to:

Andrea Parkins, American composer, sound artist and musician
Barbara Parkins (born 1942), Canadian-American actress, singer and dancer
Christopher Parkins (died 1622), English Jesuit turned diplomat and MP
David Parkins (born 1955), British cartoonist and illustrator
George Parkins ( 1576 – 1626), English Member of Parliament
Howy Parkins, American animation director
John Parkins (1571–1640), English merchant and politician
Robert Michael Parkins (died 2005), English fraudster
William Parkins (1925–1969), English cricketer
William H. Parkins, (1836–1894), American architect
Zeena Parkins (born 1956), American musician

See also
Parkin (surname)
Perkins
Perkin (surname)

English-language surnames
Surnames from given names